Chastanier is a village and commune in the Lozère department in southern France.

Population

Geography
The Chapeauroux forms part of the commune's south-western border, flows northward through the middle of the commune, then forms part of its north-western border. Good place for fishing and enjoy outdoor sports such as VTT and running.

See also
Communes of the Lozère department

References

Communes of Lozère